HMS Bullen (K 469) was a Captain-class frigate of the Royal Navy during World War II.
Originally laid down as DE-78, a turbo-electric (TE) type Buckley-class destroyer escort, she was diverted to the Royal Navy and named HMS Bullen before the launch.

Sinking
Of the crew of HMS Bullen, 71 died and 97 survived. The wrecksite is designated as a 'protected place' under the Protection of Military Remains Act 1986.

References

Donald Collingwood The Captain Class Frigates in the Second World War  Leo Cooper (1998), .
Bruce Hampton Franklin The Buckley-Class Destroyer Escorts Chatham Publishing (1999), .
Axel Niestle German U-Boat Losses During World War II United States Naval Inst (1998), .

External links
 uboat.net page for HMS Bullen
 uboat.net page for U-775
 captainclassfrigates.co.uk
 SI 2008/950 Designation under the Protection of Military Remains Act 1986

Captain-class frigates
Buckley-class destroyer escorts
World War II frigates of the United Kingdom
Protected Wrecks of Scotland
Ships built in Hingham, Massachusetts
1943 ships
Maritime incidents in December 1944
Sutherland
History of the Scottish Highlands
1943 establishments in Massachusetts
1944 disestablishments in Scotland
Ships sunk by German submarines in World War II